Montrapon, with Fontaine-Écu are two sectors forming an area located in the north of Besançon (France). In 1990, they counted approximately 10,000 inhabitants.

The Fort of Justices was located in this area.

References 

Areas of Besançon